Mount Alverstone or Boundary Peak 180, is a high peak in the Saint Elias Mountains, on the border between Alaska and Yukon. It shares a large massif with the higher Mount Hubbard to the south and the slightly lower Mount Kennedy to the east. The summit of Mount Alverstone marks a sharp turn in the Alaska/Canada border; the border goes south from this point toward the Alaska panhandle and west toward Mount Saint Elias.

The mountain was named in 1908 for Lord Richard Everard Webster Alverstone, Lord Chief Justice of England, 1900–13, and U.S. Boundary Commissioner in 1903. He served on various arbitration commissions including the one dealing with the Bering Sea Fur seal controversy. In the Alaska boundary dispute in 1903, his vote was the deciding one against Canadian claims.


Climbing
Mount Alverstone was first climbed in 1951 by a party led by Walter Wood, during an expedition that also made the first ascent of Mount Hubbard. The successful climbs were tinged by tragedy when, upon returning from the peaks, Wood learned that his wife Foresta and daughter Valerie had died in a plane crash nearby along with their pilot. Mount Foresta, near Mount Alverstone, is named in her honor.

See also

List of mountain peaks of North America
List of mountain peaks of Canada
List of mountain peaks of the United States
List of Boundary Peaks of the Alaska-British Columbia/Yukon border

References

Sources

External links

Mount Alverstone on Topozone

Mountains of Alaska
Four-thousanders of Yukon
Saint Elias Mountains
Mountains of Yakutat City and Borough, Alaska
Canada–United States border
International mountains of North America
Mount Alverstone